Shved (Cyrillic: Швед) is an Eastern Slavic surname that means "Swede". Notable people with this name include:

 Alexey Shved (born 1988), Russian basketball player
 Vasyl Shved (born 1971), Ukrainian football player
 Marian Shved (born 1997), Ukrainian football player, son of Vasyl